Phatak is a surname used by Chitpavan brahmins of the Kaushik gotra.

People 
Ashutosh Phatak, Indian music composer
Balkrishna Phatak, war secretary during the Peshwai
Deepak B. Phatak (b. 1948), Indian computer scientist
Chimnaji Phatak, aide-de-camp during the Peshwai
Jairaj Phatak, Indian IAS officer
Narahar Raghunath Phatak  (1893–1979), Indian biographer and literary critic
Ramachandra Krishanji Phatak (1917–2002), Marathi music composer and singer
Ravindra Phatak, Indian politician for Shiv Sena

People groups 
Phatak, a clan of the Ahir kshatriya community

See also

References 

Indian surnames
Marathi-language surnames